Sir Marcus Henry Richmond,  (born 1 February 1931), known as Mark Richmond, is a British biochemist, microbiologist and academic.

Early life and education
Richmond was born in 1931, the son of H. S. Richmond, a film producer. He was educated at Epsom College from 1944 to 1949, and then studied biochemistry at Clare College, Cambridge, and remained there as a postgraduate for three years.

Career
Following his doctorate he worked for the National Institute for Medical Research, subsequent to which he was a reader in molecular biology at the University of Edinburgh.

In 1968 he became Professor of Bacteriology at the University of Bristol, working on staphylococcal plasmids and antibiotic resistance. From 1981 he was Vice Chancellor of the University of Manchester.

He became Global Head of Research for Glaxo in 1991.

He retired in 1996 and took up a position as Honorary Fellow in the School of Public Policy at University College London.

He served as chair of the Committee of Vice-Chancellors and Principals of the United Kingdom and of the Science and Engineering Research Council during his time at Manchester. Following formal retirement, he has been a non-executive director of several companies, including Genentech, OSI Pharmaceuticals and Ark Therapeutics.

Awards and honours
He received the Robert Koch Medal in 1976, and the Biochemical Society's Colworth Medal. In 1982 he received the British Society for Antimicrobial Chemotherapy's Garrod Medal and delivered its accompanying lecture.

He was elected a Fellow of the Royal Society (FRS) in 1980 and was knighted in the 1986 Birthday Honours. He was also a Fellow of the Royal College of Physicians (FRCP) and a Fellow of the Royal College of Pathologists (FRCPath).

References

External links 

 

1931 births
Place of birth missing (living people)
Living people
British biochemists
British microbiologists
Alumni of Clare College, Cambridge
Academics of the University of Edinburgh
Academics of the University of Bristol
Academics of the University of Manchester
Academics of University College London
Fellows of the Royal Society
Knights Bachelor